Naqsheh-ye Naser (also Romanized as Naqsheh-ye Naṣār; also known as Naqsheh) is a village in Nasar Rural District, Arvandkenar District, Abadan County, Khuzestan Province, Iran. At the 2006 census, its population was 96, in 16 families.

References 

Populated places in Abadan County